Armendáriz is a Basque surname that may refer to:

Alejandro Armendáriz, an Argentine physician and politician, governor of Buenos Aires province (1983–1987)
José de Armendáriz,  a Spanish soldier and colonial administrator
Lope Díez de Armendáriz, a Spanish nobleman and viceroy
Montxo Armendáriz, an awarded Spanish screenwriter and film director
Pedro Armendáriz, a Mexican actor
Pedro Armendáriz Jr., a Mexican actor and son of Pedro Armendáriz
Ramon Armendariz, American baseball umpire
Saúl Armendáriz, Mexican professional wrestler

Basque-language surnames
Surnames